Princess Désirée, Baroness Silfverschiöld (Désirée Elisabeth Sibylla; born 2 June 1938) is the third child of Prince Gustaf Adolf, Duke of Västerbotten, and Princess Sibylla of Saxe-Coburg and Gotha, and granddaughter of King Gustaf VI Adolf of Sweden. She is an elder sister of King Carl XVI Gustaf of Sweden.

Early life
Désirée was born on 2 June 1938 as the third daughter and child of Prince Gustaf Adolf, Duke of Västerbotten (son of Crown Prince Gustaf Adolf of Sweden and his late wife, Princess Margaret of Connaught) and his wife, Princess Sibylla of Saxe-Coburg and Gotha (daughter of Prince Charles Edward, Duke of Saxe-Coburg and Gotha and his wife, Princess Victoria Adelaide of Schleswig-Holstein).

Desiree was christened on 30 June 1938 at Solna Church in the Solna Municipality of Stockholm, Sweden. She was given the names: Desiree after her great-4x grandmother Queen Desideria and Sibylla after her mother, Princess Sibylla.

She grew up at the family home, Haga Palace outside Stockholm, with her three sisters; together they were known as the Haga Princesses.

In November 1960, Désirée accompanied her elder sister Princess Birgitta for a visit to the United States on behalf of their grandfather King Gustaf VI Adolf for the 50th anniversary of The American-Scandinavian Foundation. In their honour a ball was organised for the two princesses at the Renaissance Blackstone Hotel in Chicago by Mayor Richard Daley.

Marriage and children

Désirée's engagement to Baron Nils-August Otto Carl Niclas Silfverschiöld, (31 May 1934 – 11 April 2017), son of Baron Carl Silfverschiöld and wife Madeleine Bennich, was announced on 18 December 1963, and the couple married on 5 June 1964 in Storkyrkan in Stockholm. As a result of her non-royal marriage, she lost her style of Royal Highness and her position as a princess of Sweden, but was given the courtesy Princess Désirée, Baroness Silfverschiöld by the King. Under the Swedish constitution of that time, she, as a woman, and her descendants were not eligible to inherit the throne. When this was later changed to absolute primogeniture the right of succession was limited to the descendants of her brother, King Carl XVI Gustaf.

Princess Désirée, Baroness Silfverschiöld's marriage has produced three children: Carl (b. 1965), Christina-Louise (b. 1966), and Hélène (b. 1968). In 1976, Hélène was a bridesmaid at the weddings of King Carl XVI Gustaf and Queen Silvia, and of Prince Bertil and Princess Lilian.

Since getting married, Silfverschiöld lives in the family's home at Koberg Castle and at Gåsevadholm Castle in Halland.

Silfverschiöld is Crown Princess Victoria's godmother. Her grandson Ian was a pageboy at Victoria's wedding.

Later life
Princess Désirée, Baroness Silfverschiöld, has occasionally attended Nobel Prize festivities and public royal-family events in Stockholm in a semi-official capacity, sometimes wearing tiaras and jewelry belonging to the royal family. She also represented Sweden in first receiving Emperor Akihito of Japan when he arrived for a state visit in 2000. She was widowed in 2017.

Honours

 2 June 1938 — 5 June 1964: Her Royal Highness Princess Désirée of Sweden
 5 June 1964 — present: Princess Désirée, Baroness Silfverschiöld

National honours

 : Member Grand Cross of the Royal Order of the Seraphim (LoK av KMO)
 : Member of the Royal Family Decoration of King Gustaf VI Adolf, 1st Class
 : Member of the Royal Family Decoration of King Carl XVI Gustaf, 1st Class
 : Recipient of the 90th Birthday Medal of King Gustav V
 : Recipient of the Commemorative Medal of King Gustav V
 : Recipient of the 85th Birthday Badge Medal of King Gustaf VI Adolf
 : Recipient of the 50th Birthday Badge Medal of King Carl XVI Gustaf
 : Recipient of the Wedding Medal of Crown Princess Victoria to Daniel Westling
 : Recipient of the Ruby Jubilee Badge Medal of King Carl XVI Gustaf
 : Recipient of the 70th Birthday Badge Medal of King Carl XVI Gustaf

Foreign honours
 : Grand Cross of the Order of Merit of the Federal Republic of Germany, 1st Class
 : Paulownia Dame Grand Cordon of the Order of the Precious Crown
 : Grand Cordon of the Order of the Pioneers of Liberia
 : Knight Grand Cross of the Order of the Gold Lion of the House of Nassau
 : Knight Grand Cross of the Order of Saint Olav

Ancestry

References

1938 births
Living people
Desiree 1938
House of Bernadotte
Disinherited European royalty
People from Solna Municipality
Swedish Lutherans
Grand Crosses 1st class of the Order of Merit of the Federal Republic of Germany
Grand Cordons of the Order of the Precious Crown